Trbovich v. United Mine Workers, 404 U.S. 528 (1972), is a 6–1 decision of the Supreme Court of the United States in which the Court held that the Labor-Management Reporting and Disclosure Act of 1959 gave union members the right to intervene in enforcement proceedings brought by the United States Department of Labor in enforcement proceedings under the Act.

Footnotes

External links
 

United States Supreme Court cases
United States Supreme Court cases of the Burger Court
United States administrative case law
1972 in United States case law
United Mine Workers of America litigation
United States labor case law